Burn Baby Burn can refer to:

Poems
"Burn Baby Burn" (poem), by Marvin X following the 1965 Watts Riots

Music
 "Burn, Baby, Burn", a 1966 song by Jimmy Collier and Frederick Douglass Kirkpatrick
"Burn Baby Burn", a 1974 song by Hudson Ford
"Burn", a 1975 song by Bruce Cockburn
"Disco Inferno", a 1976 song by The Trammps
Burn, Baby, Burn!, a 1993 album by the Electric Hellfire Club
"Burn Baby Burn" (song), by Ash, 2001
"Burn Baby Burn", a 1990 rap song by 2 Black 2 Strong

Television
"Burns, Baby Burns", an episode of the TV series The Simpsons'''

Books
 Burn, Baby, Burn! The Los Angeles Race Riot, August 1965'' (1966), a journalistic account of the Watts riots by Jerry Cohen and William S. Murphy
Burn Baby Burn (novel), a 2016 young adult novel by Meg Medina

Slogans
 "Burn, baby! Burn!", a slogan attributed to the 1960s R&B disc jockey Magnificent Montague, which became associated with the 1965 Watts Riots